Trefilovka is a rural locality (a selo) and the administrative center of Trefilovskoye Rural Settlement, Rakityansky District, Belgorod Oblast, Russia. The population was 1,419 as of 2010. There are 12 streets.

Geography 
Trefilovka is located 18 km southeast of Rakitnoye (the district's administrative centre) by road. Vvedenskaya Gotnya is the nearest rural locality.

References 

Rural localities in Rakityansky District